Stanley Rogers may refer to:
 Stanley Rogers, Tennessee lawyer and politician
 Stanley R. H. Rogers (1887–1961), American maritime author and illustrator
 Stan Rogers (1949–1983), Canadian folk singer

See also
Stan Rodger (1940–2022), New Zealand politician